The 1998 USA Outdoor Track and Field Championships took place between June 17–21 at Tad Gormley Stadium in New Orleans, Louisiana.

Results

Men track events

Men field events

Women track events

Women field events

See also
United States Olympic Trials (track and field)

References

External links
 USA Nationals results

USA Outdoor Track and Field Championships
Usa Outdoor Track And Field Championships, 1998
Track and field
1998 in sports in Louisiana
Track and field in Louisiana